Ian Hume (born 9 October 1948) is a Scottish former amateur football outside left who played in the Scottish League for Queen's Park, Stenhousemuir, Ayr United and Stirling Albion. He was capped by Scotland at amateur level.

References 

Scottish footballers
Scottish Football League players
Queen's Park F.C. players
Association football outside forwards
Scotland amateur international footballers
1948 births
Place of birth missing (living people)
Ayr United F.C. players
Stirling Albion F.C. players
Stenhousemuir F.C. players
Living people